Fox Studios may refer to one of several related companies:
 Fox Film, the movie studio from 1915 to 1935
 20th Century Fox, formed from the merger of Fox Film and 20th Century Pictures
 Fox Studios Australia, a film studio and studio location of 20th Century Fox transferred to the Walt Disney Company but that still retains the "Fox" name

See also
 Fox Movies (disambiguation)